There were two Scottish League Cup Finals played in 1947:
1947 Scottish League Cup final (April), Rangers 4–0 Aberdeen
1947 Scottish League Cup final (October), East Fife 4–0 Falkirk (replay after 0–0 draw)